Dexter Xuereb (born 21 September 1997) is a Maltese footballer who plays as a right-back for Santa Lucia and the Malta national team.

Career
Xuereb made his international debut for Malta on 30 May 2021 in a friendly match against Northern Ireland.

Career statistics

International

References

External links
 

1997 births
Living people
Maltese footballers
Malta under-21 international footballers
Malta international footballers
Association football fullbacks
Mosta F.C. players
Gżira United F.C. players
St. Lucia F.C. players
Maltese Premier League players